Polyommatus actis is a butterfly of the family Lycaenidae. It was described by Gottlieb August Wilhelm Herrich-Schäffer in 1851. It is found in Asia Minor.

References

Butterflies described in 1851
Polyommatus
Butterflies of Asia